Amy Rose Roberts (born 24 December 1994) is a Welsh racing cyclist, who last rode for UCI Women's Team .

Career
Born in Llanelli, Roberts was brought up in Pontyberem. She attended Queen Elizabeth High School, Carmarthen. Roberts took up triathlon at the age of 14, she joined the Towy Riders cycling club to improve her cycling skills and within a year of doing so had become the Under-16 Welsh National Cyclo-cross Champion. Roberts was part of British Cycling's Olympic Talent Team.

Roberts represented Wales at the Commonwealth Games in Glasgow, 2014, competing in the time trial, individual pursuit, scratch and points race.

Personal life
Roberts' younger sister Jessica Roberts is also a professional cyclist, who won the 2018 British National Road Race Championships.

Major results

2010
 National Track Championships
1st Youth Points race
3rd Junior Scratch
3rd Youth Individual pursuit
3rd Youth 500m time trial

2011
3rd Junior National Cyclo-cross Championships

2012
 1st Team pursuit, UEC European Junior Track Championships (with Elinor Barker and Lucy Garner)
 1st Overall Surf & Turf Weekend
1st Stage 2
 2nd Team pursuit, 2012–13 UCI Track World Cup, Cali
 UCI Junior Track World Championships
3rd Points race
3rd Team pursuit (with Hayley Jones and Elinor Barker)

2013
 3rd Team pursuit, 2012–13 UCI Track World Cup, Aguascalientes (with Ciara Horne and Elinor Barker)

2014
 1st Team pursuit, 2014–15 UCI Track World Cup, Guadalajara (with Laura Trott, Elinor Barker & Ciara Horne)
 1st Round 4 – Redditch, Matrix Fitness Grand Prix Series
 2nd Omnium, Open des Nations sur Piste de Roubaix
 2nd National Criterium Championships

2015
 2nd Points race, Irish International Track GP
 3rd National Criterium Championships

References

External links
 
 
 

1994 births
Living people
Sportspeople from Carmarthenshire
Welsh female cyclists
Cyclists at the 2014 Commonwealth Games
Commonwealth Games competitors for Wales